Poo Mazhai Pozhiyuthu is a 1987 Tamil language romantic drama film written and directed by V. Azhagappan. The film stars Vijayakanth and Nadhiya, with Suresh, Rajeev, S. S. Chandran and Senthil in supporting roles. It was released on 19 February 1987.

Plot 

Raja settled in Singapore, visits his native village. His aunt tries to fortify family bonds, and seeks the hand of Raja's younger sister Asha for her son Pandian. Raja sniggers at the suggestion and is nasty while pointing out how out-of-place it is. Pandian vows to marry Asha. Raja vows to see that such a thing never happens.

In Singapore, responding to Pandian's overtures, Asha first tries to knock him dead with her Datsun, and then tries to drown him with her motorboat daredevilry, but ultimately undergoes a change of heart and is eating out of his hands. But misunderstandings again cloud the relationship, and when it is cleared Raja is again at his insidious tricks invidiously playing up another suitor Ramesh.

Cast 
Vijayakanth as Pandian
Nadhiya as Asha
Suresh as Ramesh
Rajeev as Raja
S. S. Chandran as Chandran
Senthil as Senthil
Srikanth as Doctor (Guest appearance)

Production 
The film was primarily shot at Singapore and Japan.

Soundtrack 
Soundtrack was composed by R. D. Burman and lyrics were written by Vaali. The background score was composed by Shyam.
"Hey Poongodi" – S. P. Balasubrahmanyam
"Nadiya Nadiya" – S. P. Balasubrahmanyam, K. S. Chithra
"Emama" – S. P. Balasubrahmanyam, K. S. Chithra
"Ellarum Paithiyam" – K. S. Chithra
"My Name is Aasha" – S. P. Balasubrahmanyam, K. S. Chithra

Reception 
N. Krishnaswamy of The Indian Express in his review dated 20 February 1987 called it "pretty run-of-the-mill stuff", however he praised the music, locations and cinematography.

References

External links 
 

1980s Tamil-language films
1987 films
1987 romantic drama films
Films directed by V. Azhagappan
Films shot in Japan
Films shot in Singapore
Indian romantic drama films